In mathematics, in the field of harmonic analysis,
the van der Corput lemma is an estimate for oscillatory integrals
named after the Dutch mathematician J. G. van der Corput.

The following result is stated by E. Stein:

Suppose that a real-valued function  is smooth in an open interval ,
and that  for all .
Assume that either , or that
such that
 
for any .

Sublevel set estimates

The van der Corput lemma is closely related to the sublevel set estimates,
which give the upper bound on the measure of the set

Suppose that a real-valued function  is smooth
on a finite or infinite interval ,
and that  for all .
such that
for any 
the measure of the sublevel set

References

Inequalities
Harmonic analysis
Fourier analysis